Iluileq is a fjord in the King Frederick VI Coast, Kujalleq municipality, southern Greenland.

This fjord was named by Wilhelm August Graah after
David Danell, a Dutchman who made three expeditions to Greenland in 1652-54 sent by King Frederick III of Denmark.

Geography
Iluileq Fjord extends in a roughly east–west direction for about 55 km between Kangerluluk to the north and Paatusoq to the south, the latter being much closer and running parallel to it. The fjord has a large active glacier at its head and its inner section is almost always encumbered with ice floes. 

Iluileq has two short branches on its southern coast, about 2 km and 6 km from the fjord's mouth respectively. The first is very narrow. On its northern coast there is the sound separating Iluileq island from the mainland, as well as two branches with glaciers reaching down to the waterline.

Mountains

See also
List of fjords of Greenland

References

External links
The Lost Gardar Intrusion: Critical Metal Exploration at the Paatusoq Syenite Complex, South East Greenland

Fjords of Greenland